UNIX Review was an American magazine covering technical aspects of the UNIX operating system and C programming. Recognized for its in-depth technical analysis, the journal also reported on industry confabs and included some lighter fare.

History and profile
It was founded in 1983. In 1985 it was acquired by Miller Freeman. The journal was renamed to UNIX Review's Performance Computing (UR/PC) Magazine with the April 1998 issue, and ceased publication in 2000. The online publication ceased in 2007. It was published by REVIEW Publications of Renton, Washington. The rights to the title passed to United Business Media (formerly CMP Media), which was absorbed by Informa in 2018.

Regular contributors

Andrew Binstock, (editor in chief from 1991–1997), wrote "Word Wrap from the Editor"
John Chisholm (1992-1995), wrote "Currents" column
Stan Kelly-Bootle, writer of the "Devil's Advocate" column
Ken Arnold, writer of "The C Advisor" column
Rich Morin, writer of "The Human Factor" and "The Internet Notebook" columns
Joe "Zonker" Brockmeier, writer of the "Tool of the Month" column
Ed Schaefer, writer of the "Shell Corner" column
 Dinah McNutt, writer of the "Daemons and Dragons" column
Cameron Laird, regular contributor
Emmett Dulaney, regular contributor
Marcel Gagné, regular contributor
Eric Foster-Johnson, regular contributor

References

External links
UNIX Review at the Wayback Machine internet archive

1983 establishments in Washington (state)
2000 disestablishments in Washington (state)
Defunct computer magazines published in the United States
Magazines established in 1983
Magazines disestablished in 2000
Magazines published in Washington (state)
Unix history